The 1912 state election in Queensland, Australia was held on 27 April 1912.

The main parties in the election were the Liberal Party, led by Premier Digby Denham and the Labor Party, led by Leader of the Opposition David Bowman.

The election was the first conducted under the Electoral Districts Act 1910 which allowed for 72 single-member electorates based on the principle of one vote, one value.

Retiring Members

Labor
 Vincent Lesina (Clermont)
 Thomas Nevitt (Carpentaria)

Liberal
 William Thorn (Aubigny)

Candidates
Sitting members at the time of the election are shown in bold text.

See also
 1912 Queensland state election
 Members of the Queensland Legislative Assembly, 1909–1912
 Members of the Queensland Legislative Assembly, 1912–1915
 List of political parties in Australia

References
 
 "Queensland Elections", Adelaide Advertiser, 29 April 1912, page 9.

Candidates for Queensland state elections